Andrei Pacheco (born 20 September 1984 in Princes Town) is a Trinidad and Tobago football (soccer) player, who played for W Connection and currently plays for Marabella Family Crisis Centre.

Career
Pacheco signed with the Columbus Crew of Major League Soccer, but never appeared in a league match.

References

External links

1984 births
Trinidad and Tobago footballers
Columbus Crew players
Living people
2007 CONCACAF Gold Cup players
W Connection F.C. players
Point Fortin Civic F.C. players
TT Pro League players
People from Princes Town region
Association football midfielders
Trinidad and Tobago international footballers